William O'Grady may refer to:
William O'Grady (cleric) (1801–1859), Irish religious leader
William O'Grady (footballer) (fl. 1948), Irish Olympic footballer
William O'Grady (linguist) (born 1952), American linguist, known for work in syntax, acquisition, and Korean
William John O'Grady (died 1840), Irish Catholic priest and journalist in Upper Canada

See also
William O'Grady Haly, British army officer